OptaPlanner is an Open Source Constraint Solver. It solves constraint satisfaction problems with construction heuristics and metaheuristic algorithms, using multithreaded incremental solving. OptaPlanner is written in Java and works in Kotlin and Scala too.

OptaPlanner development is sponsored by Red Hat, which sells an enterprise support subscription for it.

History
It was founded by Geoffrey De Smet in July 2006 under the name Taseree on SourceForge. In 2007, it joined the Drools project as Drools Solver. The first release was drools-solver 5.0.0.M1 on 3 July 2008. In 2009 it renamed to Drools Planner.
In March 2013, it graduated from Drools project and finally renamed to OptaPlanner.
It is under continuous development by a dedicated core team (employed by Red Hat) and external community contributors.

Red Hat's support product for OptaPlanner is called Red Hat Business Optimizer (before 2018 it was called Red Hat JBoss Business Resource Planner). Between March 2014 and March 2015, Red Hat's BRMS and BPM Suite 6.0 subscriptions included it as Tech Preview. , BRMS and BPM Suite 6.1 and higher include it as Full Support.

Research competitions results
OptaPlanner contributors regularly compete against academic researchers in research competitions. Their results include:
 ICON Challenge on Algorithm Selection (2014) (2nd place)
 International Timetabling Competition (2007) (4th place on Track 1)

References

External links
 

Mathematical optimization software